The Danish Wadden Sea Islands are a group of islands on the western coast of Jutland, Denmark. They have belonged to the region of Southern Denmark since January 1, 2007. Previously they belonged to the counties of South Jutland and Ribe.

The Danish islands differ from the German North Frisian Islands because no Frisians live on the Danish islands.

The islands
Fanø is located just off Esbjerg to which it is connected by a ferry. The main towns on Fanø are Nordby and Sønderho. Other towns include Fanø Vesterhavsbad and Rindby. , about 3,169 people live there. A variety of environments is to be found on Fanø. Not surprisingly, a very common one is sand. The island's whole western shore is made up of beaches, and the sea off the island's northwest end is also home to the "Søren-Jessens-Sand", a vast sandbank. Fanø also has heath and a small pine wood.

Mandø is a smaller island farther south, a bit farther from the mainland. It is Denmark's only Hallig, being much like the islands bearing that description among the German islands. A dike on Mandø keeps the sea at bay. Much of the islanders' history involve efforts to reclaim parts of their island from the sea.

Rømø is currently the southernmost of Denmark's Wadden Sea Islands (a small uninhabited one called Jordsand was farther south, but sank in 1999, leaving behind only a sandbank). It is home to a number of small communities such as Kongsmark, Østerby, Lakolk, and Sønderstrand.

There is also a small island among Denmark's share of the archipelago called Langli, which is to be found in the Ho Bugt north of Esbjerg. It is the northernmost island in the whole group. It was once part of a peninsula whose landward stretch was washed away in a storm tide centuries ago. Since then, another spit has formed to the west and now shields Langli from some of the sea's more destructive tendencies. Langli is nowadays home to a natural science station, housed in a villa built in the 20th century.

Jordsand and Koresand are two sandbanks in the Danish Wadden Sea. Jordsand is a former hallig.

See also
List of islands of Denmark

References

External links

 
Islands of Denmark
Frisian Islands
Geography of Esbjerg Municipality
Geography of Tønder Municipality